Grebly is a village in Velikoluksky District of Pskov Oblast, Russia.  Postal code: 182170.

Rural localities in Pskov Oblast